Jassa Dhillon is an Indian singer and songwriter who is associated with the Punjabi music industry. His song "Talja" has featured on the UK Asian Music Chart and also the Global YouTube weekly chart.

Early life and education
Dhillon was born 7 November 1995 in Assandh, in the Karnal district, Haryana, to Ranbir Singh Dhillon and Harjinder Kaur.He is a Dhillon Jat Sikh. He graduated from JPS Academy.

Music career
Dhillon works in a variety of music styles, including Punjabi, Pop, Bhangra, Romantic and Hip Hop. Dhillon was launched by Nav Sandhu with "Pyar Bolda," a single released in October 2019 under banner of Brown Town Music. In December 2019, his song "Jhanjhar" was released under the label of Brown Town Music. In January he announced his debut album "Above All" with Gur Sidhu as music producer on the album. In February, he released the first song from album AboveAll" named "Raule", which later appeared on YouTube's weekly Global Music Chart. Dhillon also become one of the most-listened-to artists in Punjab. In 2021, he released his album Above All. The full album proved to be successful specially songs Talja, Love Like Me, 1 on 1, Bhalwani Gedi etc. The song "Talja" from album featured on the UK Asian Music Chart. The album proved to be breakthrough in Jassa's career.

Discography

Studio albums

Extended plays

Singles discography

As lead artist

Film Soundtracks

Songwriting discography

References

External links
 
 
 

Punjabi musicians
Indian male composers
Indian lyricists
21st-century Indian male singers
21st-century Indian singers
Indian Sikhs
1999 births
Living people